Little Big Adventure 2 is a 1997 adventure game developed by Adeline Software International and published by Electronic Arts.

It was later re-released by Activision in June 1997 in North America under the name Twinsen's Odyssey. In July 1997, both Electronic Arts and Virgin Interactive Software re-released LBA 2 - Virgin Interactive Software doing so under the name of "Twinsen's Odyssey". LBA 2 sold over 300,000 copies worldwide.

The game is a sequel to Little Big Adventure (also known as Relentless: Twinsen's Adventure). LBA 2 was also the third game created under the label of Adeline Software International. The game features three-dimensional environments and full-motion video, and all of its music is in CD-DA quality.

In October 2011 Little Big Adventure 2 was re-released digitally on GOG.com and in October 2015 on Steam. In October 2021 both Little Big Adventure 1 and 2 engines source code were released under the GPL.

Gameplay
Little Big Adventure 2 has two viewing modes - for indoor scenes it uses a 3D isometric perspective (the game field is rotated 45 degrees) like its predecessor, but for outdoor scenes a 3D perspective view is used. All characters and vehicles are 3D polygon-based objects, allowing for full rotation and movement abilities. The interior game field is divided in scenes (a small block of the game that is active). After completion of certain tasks the player is presented with a full motion video sequence. All text in the game is spoken by the characters. The LBA world is considered extremely large and varied for games of its time.  There are three planets to visit, with Twinsun and Zeelich containing their own islands, each with their own unique graphical style. Essentially every character in the game is interactive and will respond differently when Twinsen speaks to them.

Like its predecessor, LBA 2 is real-time adventure. It combines several action game/arcade sequences and some elements from the role-playing game genre. The game's gameplay is partially free-roaming, allowing the player to travel around the islands once they have been "unlocked" by completing certain objectives; there are also many tasks which are optional or non-linear. Certain locations in the game are initially blocked from the player until they progress to a certain stage.

Almost all characters can be talked to, and enemies are often performing tasks while the game world is active.

Plot
After Twinsen defeated FunFrock at the end of Little Big Adventure, Twinsun was peaceful, until a sudden storm covered Citadel Island. The Dino-Fly, a creature encountered in LBA 1 is struck by lightning and crashes in Twinsen and Zoe's garden. Twinsen seeks help from Ker'aooc, a healing wizard, who lives on Desert Island. But ferry crossings are cancelled. He aids Bersimon, the island's weather wizard, resulting in the clouds disappearing. After the storm, alien creatures, who call themselves Esmers, land on the planet, under a false diplomatic guise and Twinsen begins training under the Wizard's School after hearing of missing children on the planet. The Esmers use their army to secretly capture Twinsun's Children and openly invite the Wizards to their planet (which is revealed later to be a trap to capture them). After graduating as a wizard, Twinsen is informed by his master of the possible plot of the Esmers and is sent to investigate their planet by accepting their invitation to all Wizards. Once Twinsen lands in Zeelich (the Esmers' two-layered, Jupiter-like gas home planet), the invitation proves to be a trap and he is arrested on the landing port. After tricking one of the guards with the help of another prisoner, Twinsen manages to escape imprisonment and escapes the planet in one of the ships. He eventually crashes in the mountains of Citadel Island, where he is attacked by an Esmerian soldier, after defeating him and making his way into the city he finds out that the Esmers have taken over the planet and have imposed martial law. After going home to check on Zoe he finds out that Baldino has left him a protopack (Prototype Jetpack; it can hover, not fly) in the warehouse, he retrieves it and sets out to find his friend. Once making it to Desert Island he finds out that Baldino has disappeared, he proceeds to investigate his house and discovers that Baldino has built a spacecraft and for some reason went to Emerald Moon (Twinsun's moon). He visits the Wizard's School and learns from his master that in order to proceed in his journey and face the Esmers, who prove to be more than he can handle, he must obtain a powerful artifact from beneath Citadel Island.

Home to several different species, Zeelich is a two-layered planet, the upper layer located above the sea of toxic gas that plagues the planet. The lower layer is located beneath the gas. Its inhabitants await the day when a certain prophecy will be fulfilled, and the Dark Monk, the shadow god, will emerge and restore Zeelich.

Twinsen eventually gathers together four fragments making up a key which must be placed inside a little temple on Celebration Island. He unmasks Dark Monk, who is really FunFrock, the villain from the first game. He kills FunFrock, and returns to stop the moon of Twinsun crashing into the planet.

Development
The music of Little Big Adventure 2 is composed by the French composer Philippe Vachey.

Reception

Little Big Adventure 2 sold above 300,000 units by August 1999. GameSpot reported, "In France, Twinsen is big. In the States, he's an obscure oddity."

Robert Coffey of Computer Gaming World said, "With its unparalleled sense of marvel and imagination, engaging story, and deft mix of action and adventure, Twinsen's Odyssey is a true delight and simply the most charming game I've ever played". GameSpot's Ron Dulin gave the game 8.1 out of 10, stating "Fans of adventure games will not want to pass this one up". José Dias of Adventure Classic Gaming said "Relentless: Twinsen's Adventure is among the most original and intriguing adventure games ever released." and gave it a 4 out of 5.

Next Generation rated it four stars out of five, and stated that "if you love action/adventure games, Twinsen's Odyssey should be in your collection."

Little Big Adventure 2 was a runner-up for Computer Gaming Worlds 1997 "Adventure Game of the Year" award, which ultimately went to The Curse of Monkey Island. The editors called Little Big Adventure 2 "a charming 3D action/adventure hybrid."

References

External links
Little Big Adventure II, a mirror of the original official LBA 2 website.

1997 video games
Action-adventure games
Adventure games
Adeline Software International games
Activision games
Commercial video games with freely available source code
DOS games
Electronic Arts games
Games commercially released with DOSBox
Open-source video games
Software using the GPL license
Video game sequels
Video games developed in France
Video games with isometric graphics
Windows games